Laure Miller (born 25 December 1983) is a French politician from En Marche who has been Member of Parliament for Marne's 2nd constituency in the National Assembly since a by-election in 2023.

Political career 
In 2022, she contested Marne's 2nd constituency but was defeated in the first round, coming in third place.

See also 

 List of deputies of the 16th National Assembly of France

References

External links 

 Laure Miller at the National Assembly

Living people
1983 births
People from Reims
Deputies of the 16th National Assembly of the French Fifth Republic
21st-century French politicians
21st-century French women politicians
Women members of the National Assembly (France)
Members of Parliament for Marne
Union for a Popular Movement politicians
The Republicans (France) politicians
La République En Marche! politicians
Candidates for the 2022 French legislative election